John Francis Williams (January 7, 1887 – May 29, 1953) was an Army National Guard Major General who served as Chief of the National Guard Bureau during World War II.

Early life
John Francis Williams was born in Wilkes-Barre, Pennsylvania on January 7, 1887, and raised in Pierce City, Missouri.  He enlisted in the 2nd Infantry Regiment of the Missouri National Guard in March 1903 and was discharged in September 1904 with the rank of private.

He worked as the manager of zinc mines in Missouri until attending college, graduating from the University of Missouri in 1911.  He then became a reporter and editor for the St. Louis Star and other Missouri newspapers.

World War I
When the United States entered World War I in April 1917, he was commissioned a first lieutenant in the 128th Machine Gun Battalion, 35th Infantry Division, and served in France until returning home in 1919.

Following the war, Williams became a reporter for the Kansas City Star and editor for the Joplin Globe, later the Joplin News-Herald.

Post World War I
From 1922 to 1936 Williams was director of publications for the University of Missouri.

Williams again entered the military when he was appointed major in June 1921 and became commander of the 128th Field Artillery Regiment with the rank of colonel in April 1923.

In 1935 he was appointed Deputy Chief of the National Guard Bureau as a brigadier general, and also served as Chief of the NGB Regulations and Personnel Divisions.  In 1936 he acted as Chief of the National Guard Bureau prior to Albert H. Blanding assuming the post.

World War II
He was appointed as Chief of the National Guard Bureau in January 1940, with the rank of major general, and served for the entire duration of the US involvement in World War II.

During his tenure Williams lobbied to ensure that the National Guard would be considered in the Army's post-war plans, and that it would be included in the newly organized United States Air Force.

Awards and decorations
Williams received the Distinguished Service Medal in recognition of his World War II service.

Death and burial
Following retirement in January 1946, Williams moved to Pasadena, California, where he died from cancer on May 29, 1953.  Williams and his wife Mary Way Williams (1889–1952) are buried at Arlington National Cemetery

References

External links
 John F. Williams at Arlington National Cemetery
 Generals of World War II

1887 births
1953 deaths
People from Pierce City, Missouri
University of Missouri alumni
American military personnel of World War I
Recipients of the Distinguished Service Medal (US Army)
National Guard (United States) generals
United States Army generals
Chiefs of the National Guard Bureau
People from Wilkes-Barre, Pennsylvania
People from Pasadena, California
Burials at Arlington National Cemetery
United States Army generals of World War II
Military personnel from California
Military personnel from Pennsylvania